John Kenneth Hacking (21 March 1909 – 3 August 1999) was an English cricketer.  Hacking was a right-handed batsman who bowled right-arm medium pace.  He was born at Kenilworth, Warwickshire, and was educated at Warwick School.

Hacking made a single first-class appearance for Warwickshire against Lancashire at Old Trafford in the 1946 County Championship.  Warwickshire won the toss and elected to bat, making just 100 all out in their first-innings, with Hacking who batted at number seven scoring 14 runs before he was dismissed by Eddie Phillipson.  Lancashire responded in their first-innings with 292 all out, to which Warwickshire responded to in their second-innings with 232 all out, with Hacking making 3 runs batting at number six, before he was dismissed by William Roberts.  Lancashire went on to win the match by 9 wickets.  This was his only major appearance for Warwickshire.

He died at Warwick, Warwickshire, on 3 August 1999.

References

External links
John Hacking at ESPNcricinfo
John Hacking at CricketArchive

1909 births
1999 deaths
People from Kenilworth
People educated at Warwick School
English cricketers
Warwickshire cricketers